Cecilia Hae-Jin Lee (born November 14, 1970) is a Korean American writer, artist, photographer and chef. She works in installation, photography, painting and drawing. She has written for magazines, newspapers and online publications.

Early life
Lee was born in Seoul, South Korea. She emigrated to the United States with her family in 1977. They first moved to Reading, Pennsylvania, and  then  to Los Angeles in 1978. She studied Biochemistry and Visual Arts (specifically painting, conceptual art and site-specific installation) at the University of California, San Diego. She decided against a medical career to pursue a life in the arts.

Career
Lee was the owner and chef of Nabi, a fast-casual Korean restaurant in East Hollywood.

Writing
Lee has written cookbooks, travel guides and numerous magazine and newspaper articles. Her book, Eating Korean: from Barbecue to Kimchi, Recipes from My Home was chosen as the Best of the Best by Food and Wine magazine. Her second cookbook, Quick and Easy Korean Cooking, was chosen as the cookbook of the month by the now-defunct Gourmet magazine. The book was reviewed in the Christian Science Monitor noting both the recipes and the photographs. The New York Times reviewed the cookbook and one of her recipes was featured in the Times cooking section. The Los Angeles Times has written about her recipes.

Her cookbook, Quick and Easy Mexican Cooking featured in L.A. Weekly, and was nominated for the Gourmand World Cookbook awards.

Lee has written the first edition Frommer's South Korea travel guide and wrote two successive editions. She also authored the 1st edition of Frommer's Day by Day Seoul.

She has written and photographed for the Los Angeles Times since 1999. She is a freelance restaurant reviewer for the LA Times Daily Dish and contributed to a variety of other publications.

Artwork
She is also a painter, illustrator and a site-specific, conceptual and mixed media artist. She has created public art pieces for Pecan Park in Los Angeles and a memorial for Cesar Chazez at the University of Southern California (USC).

Her work has been exhibited in numerous galleries, including the musée de l'Elysée Lausanne in Switzerland, Galeria de la Historia de Concepción in Chile, Piazza Risorgimento in Italy, Galería Asociacion de Bancarios del Urugua, Centro Cultural de la Raza in Mexico, Museum of Contemporary Art in San Diego, Tacoma Art Museum, Scottsdale Center for the Arts, Neuberger Museum of Art, San Jose Museum of Art, Gallery 825, Artspace, Pierce College, Loyola Law School, Rita Dean, the Hatch Gallery and the Los Angeles Municipal Gallery at Barnsdall.

Bibliography
 Eating Korean: From Barbecue to Kimchi, Recipes from My Home (Wiley 2005)
 Best of the Best Volume 9: The Best Recipes from the 25 Best Cookbooks of the Year (Food + Wine 2006)
 Food + Wine Annual Cookbook: An Entire Year of Recipes (Food + Wine 2006)
 Eating Well Serves Two: 150 Healthy in a Hurry Recipes (Countryman 2006)
 Frommer's South Korea (Frommer's 2010, 2008)
 Quick and Easy Korean Cooking (Chronicle Books 2009)
 Quick and Easy Mexican Cooking (Chronicle Books 2011)
 Frommer's Day by Day Seoul (Frommer's 2011)

Awards
Gourmand World Cookbook Award nominee, 2010
Gourmet cookbook of the month, June 2009
Food & Wine's Best of the Best, 2006
James Beard Award nominee, 2006
President's Call to Service Award from the President's Council on Service and the Beyond the Bell branch of LAUSD 2004
International Visual Artist of the Year Nomination, 2004
Hedgebrook residency, 1999 and 2004
Top 10 Recipes of the Year from Los Angeles Times, 1999 and 2000

References

External links
Cecilia Lee's official site
Korean food site
Zagat-Nabi Korean Restaurant
Korea Society Podcast: Cookbook Author Cecilia Hae-Jin Lee Discusses Quick and Easy Korean Cooking
Cecilia Hae-Jin Lee's Vegetable Noodle Tangle recipe in Food and Wine
Cecilia Hae-Jin Lee's Spicy Udon and Clam recipe in Food and Wine
Cecilia Hae-Jin Lee's IMDB page

1970 births
Living people
American cookbook writers
American food writers
American travel writers
American women non-fiction writers
American writers of Korean descent
South Korean emigrants to the United States
University of California, San Diego alumni
People from Seoul
21st-century American women